KISX (107.3 FM) is a Townsquare Media radio station licensed to Whitehouse, Texas, serving the Tyler/ Longview market with an urban adult contemporary format. Studios are located in south Tyler; transmitter site is located southeast of Tyler in Smith County.

History

Early days
The history of this license allocation can be traced to a house on East Main Street in Whitehouse. There, KFML 99.3 resided both physically and on-air in the home as the back yard was the location of the broadcast tower. KFML signed on in the summer of 1983 and was originally an easy listening format. Several months after signing on, KFML moved out of the house and into its new home on NNE Loop 323 in Tyler. KFML also traded callsigns and became KEYP on 9 January 1984. "Y99 - Tyler's Hot FM" was born with the callsign change. Y99 featured a Top 40 music format and was home to air talents such as Pat O'Briant and Mike O'Neill. Y99 was also involved in the community through its sponsorship of "D-FY-IT: Drug Free Youth in Texas" as well as its air talent making appearances at Friday night high school dances during football season. But, all good things come to an end. A frequency reallocation saw the 99.3 allocation shifted to 107.3, thus beginning the "KISS 107" era. When the switch was being carried out, a computerized voice (very similar to a recorded telephone message) was heard saying, "The number you dialed, 99.3, has changed. Please make note of the new number, 107.3" and was looped for a few days before the 99.3 transmitter was powered down for the final time.

Kiss 107 FM
KISX first signed on in 1990 as a classic hits station. After a little while in the classic hits format, KISX switched back to Top 40 (CHR) as "Kiss 107.3."  It later changed its format to Hot AC as "Mix 107.3." KISX evolved back to CHR (Top 40) by 1996. The "Mix" branding continued until a year after KISX was acquired by Clear Channel Communications and converted the station to its brand of CHR format. On December 17, 2001, KISX re-launched its CHR (Top 40) format as "Kiss 107 FM." The first song on "Kiss" was "Get Ready for This" by 2 Unlimited. KISX was originally a Top 40/Pop station, commonly known as KISS-FM through Clear Channel's format trademarking.

Hot 107.3 Jamz
In 2005, that format was ditched for Urban AC, but the playlist platform was modeled after its sister station KHHT in Los Angeles to differentiate from the now-defunct competitor KVEE. It is home to Steve Harvey in the mornings. Clear Channel exited small markets like Tyler in 2007, and sold KISX. KISX is currently owned by Townsquare Media.

Return to Kiss
On April 13, 2020, KISX tweaked its imaging by reverting to the station's former "KISS FM" branding, while the format remains Urban Adult Contemporary. Carrying the slogan "#1 for R&B", Kiss continues to mix older classics with today's R&B and Soul hits. Concurrent with the change, Townsquare Media has also swapped out syndicated morning shows, replacing Premiere's Steve Harvey show for Reach Media's Rickey Smiley.

References

External links

ISX
Tyler, Texas
Urban adult contemporary radio stations in the United States
Radio stations established in 2005
Townsquare Media radio stations